Austin Joseph Puckett (born May 27, 1995) is an American professional baseball pitcher in the Seattle Mariners organization. Prior to pitching professionally, Puckett played college baseball for the Pepperdine Waves of Pepperdine University.

Career

Kansas City Royals
Puckett attended De La Salle High School in Concord, California. He played baseball and American football for De La Salle, pitching for the baseball team and playing quarterback and safety in football. The Oakland Athletics selected Puckett in the 35th round of the 2013 MLB draft, but he did not sign with Oakland. Puckett then enrolled at Pepperdine University and played college baseball for the Pepperdine Waves. In 2015, he played collegiate summer baseball with the Chatham Anglers of the Cape Cod Baseball League. In 2016, his junior year, Puckett pitched  innings without allowing a run, the third-longest scoreless streak in NCAA Division I history. He finished his junior year with a 9–3 win–loss record, a 1.27 ERA, and 95 strikeouts to 26 walks in  innings. Puckett was named a First Team All-American by the American Baseball Coaches Association, Baseball America, and Collegiate Baseball Newspaper. He was named a Second Team All-American by the National Collegiate Baseball Writers Association.

The Kansas City Royals selected Puckett in the second round, with the 67th overall selection, of the 2016 MLB draft. He signed with the Royals, receiving a $1.2 signing bonus. After signing, he was assigned to the AZL Royals, and after pitching to a 3.86 ERA in two games, he was promoted to the Lexington Legends where he posted a 2–3 record and 3.66 ERA in 11 games. He began the 2017 season with the Wilmington Blue Rocks.

Chicago White Sox
The Royals traded Puckett and Andre Davis to the Chicago White Sox for Melky Cabrera on July 30, 2017. The White Sox assigned him to the Winston-Salem Dash. In 25 total games started between Wilmington and Winston-Salem, Puckett posted a 10–7 record with a 3.98 ERA. He missed the entire 2018 season with elbow pain, and elected to undergo Tommy John surgery on March 13, 2019.

Atlanta Braves
On December 10, 2020, the Atlanta Braves selected Puckett in the minor league phase of the Rule 5 draft. Puckett split the 2021 season between the High-A Rome Braves and the Double-A Mississippi Braves, accumulating a 4-6 record and 2.90 ERA with 72 strikeouts in 80.2 innings pitched across 20 games.

In 2022, Puckett returned to Mississippi. In 33 games, he struggled to a 2-5 record and 7.36 ERA with 74 strikeouts in 58.2 innings of work. He elected free agency on November 10, 2022.

Seattle Mariners
On February 8, 2023, Puckett signed a minor league contract with the Seattle Mariners organization.

Personal life
Between his sophomore and junior years of high school, Puckett suffered a brain injury. Doctors put him in a medically induced coma for three days.

References

External links

1995 births
Living people
People from Danville, California
Baseball players from California
Baseball pitchers
Pepperdine Waves baseball players
All-American college baseball players
Chatham Anglers players
Arizona League Royals players
Lexington Legends players
Wilmington Blue Rocks players
Winston-Salem Dash players
De La Salle High School (Concord, California) alumni